The 1961 Middle Tennessee Blue Raiders football team represented the Middle Tennessee State College—now known as Middle Tennessee State University—as a member of the Ohio Valley Conference (OVC) during the 1961 NCAA College Division football season. Led by 15th-year head coach Charles M. Murphy, the Blue Raiders compiled a record an overall record of 7–4 with a mark of 5–1 in conference play, placing second in the OVC. Middle Tennessee was invited to the Tangerine Bowl, where they lost to Lamar Tech. The team's captains were Don Faulk and Jerry Pearson.

Schedule

References

Middle Tennessee
Middle Tennessee Blue Raiders football seasons
Middle Tennessee Blue Raiders football